The Oldmans Township School District is a community public school district that serves  students in kindergarten through eighth grade from Oldmans Township in Salem County, New Jersey, United States.

As of the 2018–19 school year, the district, comprising one school, had an enrollment of 290 students and 22.5 classroom teachers (on an FTE basis), for a student–teacher ratio of 12.9:1.

The district is classified by the New Jersey Department of Education as being in District Factor Group "A", the lowest of eight groupings. District Factor Groups organize districts statewide to allow comparison by common socioeconomic characteristics of the local districts. From lowest socioeconomic status to highest, the categories are A, B, CD, DE, FG, GH, I and J.

A majority of public school students in ninth through twelfth grades from Oldmans Township (more than 70% in 2018) attend Penns Grove High School as part of a sending/receiving relationship with the Penns Grove-Carneys Point Regional School District, with the balance (the remaining 30%) attending Woodstown High School in the Woodstown-Pilesgrove Regional School District, which also serves students from Alloway Township and Upper Pittsgrove Township. Students from Oldmans Township living west of Interstate 295 are sent to Penns Grove, while those east of the highway are sent to Woodstown. As of the 2018–19 school year, Penns Grove High School had an enrollment of 508 students and 50.0 classroom teachers (on an FTE basis), for a student–teacher ratio of 10.2:1, while Woodstown High School had an enrollment of 603 students and 48.6 classroom teachers (on an FTE basis), for a student–teacher ratio of 12.4:1.

In 2016, the district commissioned a study by the Southern Regional Institute and Educational Technology Training Center at Stockton University to consider sending all students in grades 9-12 to Woodstown High School. The study concluded that Woodstown has the capacity to handle all of the students from Oldmans Township, but noted that the withdrawal from Penns Grove would results in a small decrease in the number of white students in that district's high school. In 2018, the Oldmans Township district sought permission from the Commissioner of Education to send all students to Woodstown, which has been opposed by the Penns Grove district based on the financial impact caused by the loss of tuition.

School
Oldmans Township School had an enrollment of 286 students in grades PreK-8 as of the 2018–19 school year.
Alicia Smith, Principal

Administration
Core members of the district's administration are:
Alicia Smith, Superintendent
Pamela Zook, Business Administrator / Board Secretary

Board of education
The district's board of education, with nine members, sets policy and oversees the fiscal and educational operation of the district through its administration. As a Type II school district, the board's trustees are elected directly by voters to serve three-year terms of office on a staggered basis, with three seats up for election each year held (since 2012) as part of the November general election. The board appoints a superintendent to oversee the day-to-day operation of the district.

References

External links
Oldmans Township School District

School Data for the Oldmans Township School, National Center for Education Statistics
Woodstown High School
Penns Grove-Carneys Point Regional School District
Penns Grove High School

Oldmans Township, New Jersey
New Jersey District Factor Group A
School districts in Salem County, New Jersey
Public K–8 schools in New Jersey